Un Millón de Rosas is the nineteenth studio album released by American band La Mafia. It was released on January 30, 1996 by Sony Music Entertainment. The album peaked at number one in the Billboard Regional Mexican Albums chart and also reached top ten in the Billboard Top Latin Songs chart. Un Millón de Rosas earned them the Grammy Award for Best Mexican/Mexican-American Album at the 39th Grammy Awards. At the 9th Lo Nuestro Awards, it received a nomination for Regional Mexican Album of the Year.

Track listing

Chart performance

References

1996 albums
La Mafia albums
Spanish-language albums
Grammy Award for Best Mexican/Mexican-American Album